Terra Nova Bay is a bay which is often ice free, about  long, lying between Cape Washington and the Drygalski Ice Tongue along the coast of Victoria Land, Antarctica. It was discovered by the British National Antarctic Expedition (known as the Discovery Expedition) under Robert Falcon Scott, 1901–1904, and named by him after Terra Nova, one of the relief ships for the expedition. The Italian permanent Zucchelli Station is located in the bay, as is the Jang Bogo Station of South Korea. Relief Inlet can be found in the south west corner of the Bay.

Antarctic Specially Protected Area
It is an important site for long-term research on the marine ecology of benthic communities. As well as rich and complex sponge and anthozoan communities, the site supports a colony of Adélie penguins at Adélie Cove.

References

Bays of Victoria Land
Scott Coast